was a Japanese baseball player and manager. He played for the Mainichi Orions from 1950 to 1955. As a manager he won eight Pacific League pennants. However his clubs would never go on to win the Japan Series, earning him the nickname "Great Tragic Leader". Nishimoto was inducted into the Japanese Baseball Hall of Fame in 1988. He died of heart failure on 25 November 2011 aged 91.

References

External links
Yukio Nishimoto career statistics at yakyubaka.com

1920 births
2011 deaths
Baseball people from Hyōgo Prefecture
Japanese baseball players
Mainichi Orions players
Managers of baseball teams in Japan
Chiba Lotte Marines managers
Orix Buffaloes managers
Osaka Kintetsu Buffaloes managers